Fermanagh and South Tyrone may refer to two electoral divisions in Northern Ireland:

Fermanagh and South Tyrone (Assembly constituency)
Fermanagh and South Tyrone (UK Parliament constituency)